Trishneet Arora was born on 2 November, 1993 in Ludhiana, Punjab, India. He is the founder and chief executive officer of TAC Security, a cyber security company. He was named in Forbes 30 Under 30 2018 Asia list and Fortune India 40 Under 40 2019 List of India's Brightest Business Minds.

Career 
Arora founded TAC Security, a cyber security company that provides protection to corporations against network vulnerabilities and data theft. Some of his clients are Reliance Industries, Central Bureau of Investigation, Punjab Police (India) and Gujarat Police. He helps the Punjab and Gujarat police in investigating cyber crimes, for which he has conducted training sessions with officials.

Arora's company mainly provides vulnerability assessment and penetration testing services. According to Arora, there has been an increase in the number of attacks against portals of companies.

Awards and recognition

Biographical film 
Film-maker Sunil Bohra is working on a biographical film about Arora. Hansal Mehta will be directing the movie and currently working on the story.

Personal life 
Trishneet also invest in startups as an angel investor. In 2020 invested in online gaming company Oneiric.

References

External links 

 Official Facebook

1993 births
Living people
Businesspeople from Ludhiana
English-language writers from India
Indian technology writers
Punjabi people
Chief executives of computer security organizations